Willow Lake is a city in Clark County, South Dakota, United States. The population was 255 at the 2020 census.

The city took its name from Willow Lake, a natural lake near the town site.

Geography

Willow Lake has been assigned the ZIP code 57278 and the FIPS place code 71940.

Demographics

2010 census
As of the census of 2010, there were 263 people, 115 households, and 68 families residing in the city. The racial makeup of the city was 92.0% White, 7.2% from other races, and 0.8% from two or more races. Hispanic or Latino of any race were 8.0% of the population.

There were 115 households, of which 27.0% had children under the age of 18 living with them, 44.3% were married couples living together, 9.6% had a female householder with no husband present, 5.2% had a male householder with no wife present, and 40.9% were non-families. 37.4% of all households were made up of individuals, and 23.5% had someone living alone who was 65 years of age or older. The average household size was 2.29 and the average family size was 3.03.

The median age in the city was 42.2 years. 26.2% of residents were under the age of 18; 11.9% were between the ages of 18 and 24; 14.4% were from 25 to 44; 28.9% were from 45 to 64; and 18.6% were 65 years of age or older. The gender makeup of the city was 50.6% male and 49.4% female.

2000 census
As of the census of 2000, there were 294 people, 126 households, and 75 families residing in the city. The population density was 793.7 people per square mile (306.8/km2). There were 148 housing units at an average density of 399.6 per square mile (154.4/km2). The racial makeup of the city was 93.88% White, 5.10% Native American, and 1.02% from two or more races.

There were 126 households, out of which 28.6% had children under the age of 18 living with them, 50.0% were married couples living together, 7.1% had a female householder with no husband present, and 39.7% were non-families. 37.3% of all households were made up of individuals, and 23.0% had someone living alone who was 65 years of age or older. The average household size was 2.33 and the average family size was 3.11.

In the city, the population was spread out, with 31.3% under the age of 18, 3.4% from 18 to 24, 21.1% from 25 to 44, 22.4% from 45 to 64, and 21.8% who were 65 years of age or older. The median age was 38 years. For every 100 females, there were 94.7 males. For every 100 females age 18 and over, there were 88.8 males.

The median income for a household in the city was $30,625, and the median income for a family was $34,750. Males had a median income of $25,250 versus $20,833 for females. The per capita income for the city was $13,585. About 13.6% of families and 20.1% of the population were below the poverty line, including 29.3% of those under the age of eighteen and 20.3% of those 65 or over.

Notable people
Art Fryslie, farmer and politician
Clarence Gonstead, chiropractor, was born in Willow Lake

References

Cities in Clark County, South Dakota
Cities in South Dakota